= James Vick (publisher) =

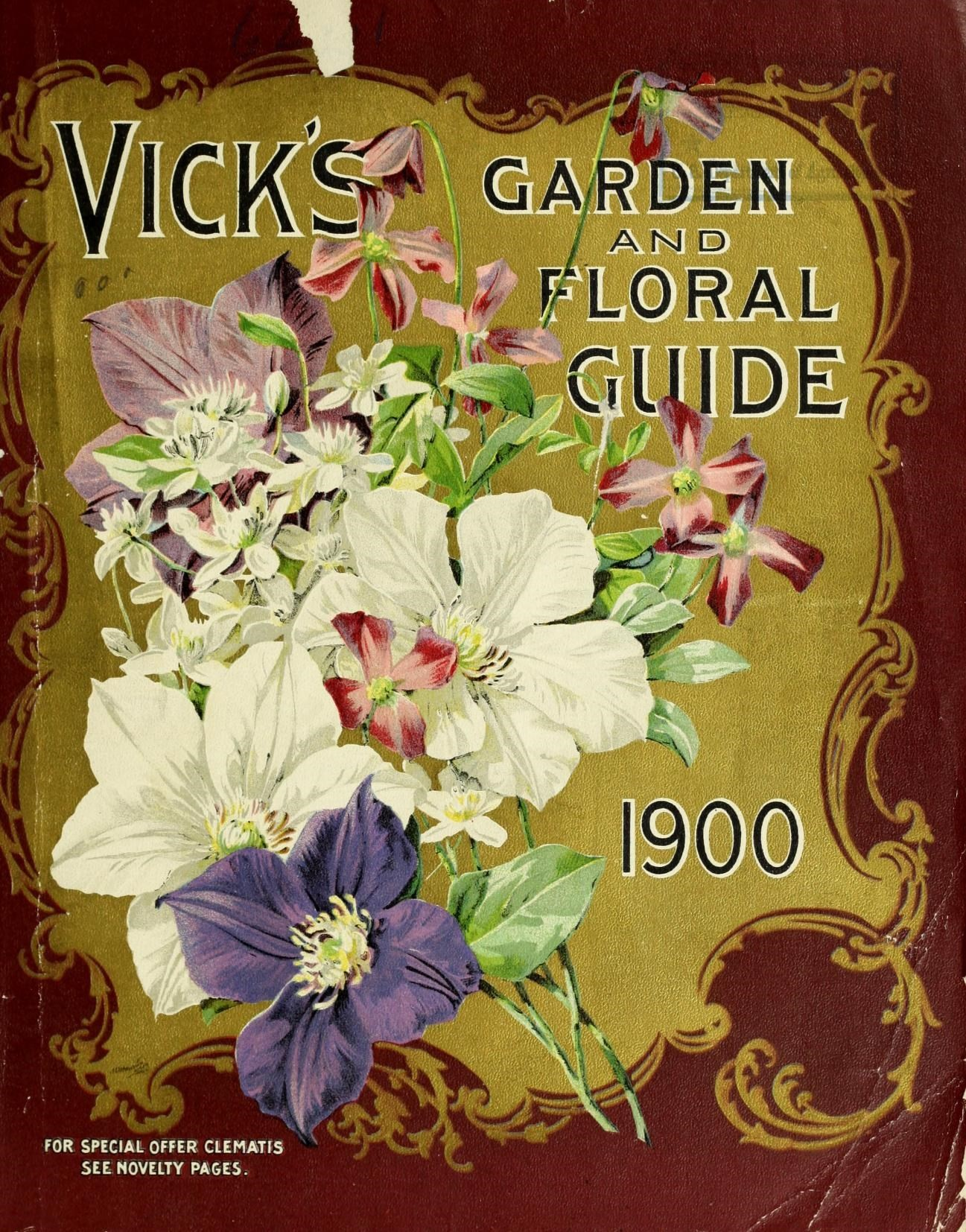

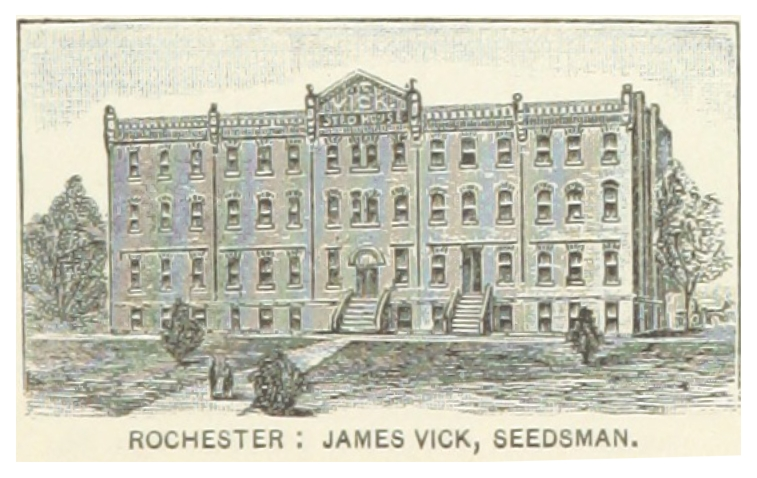

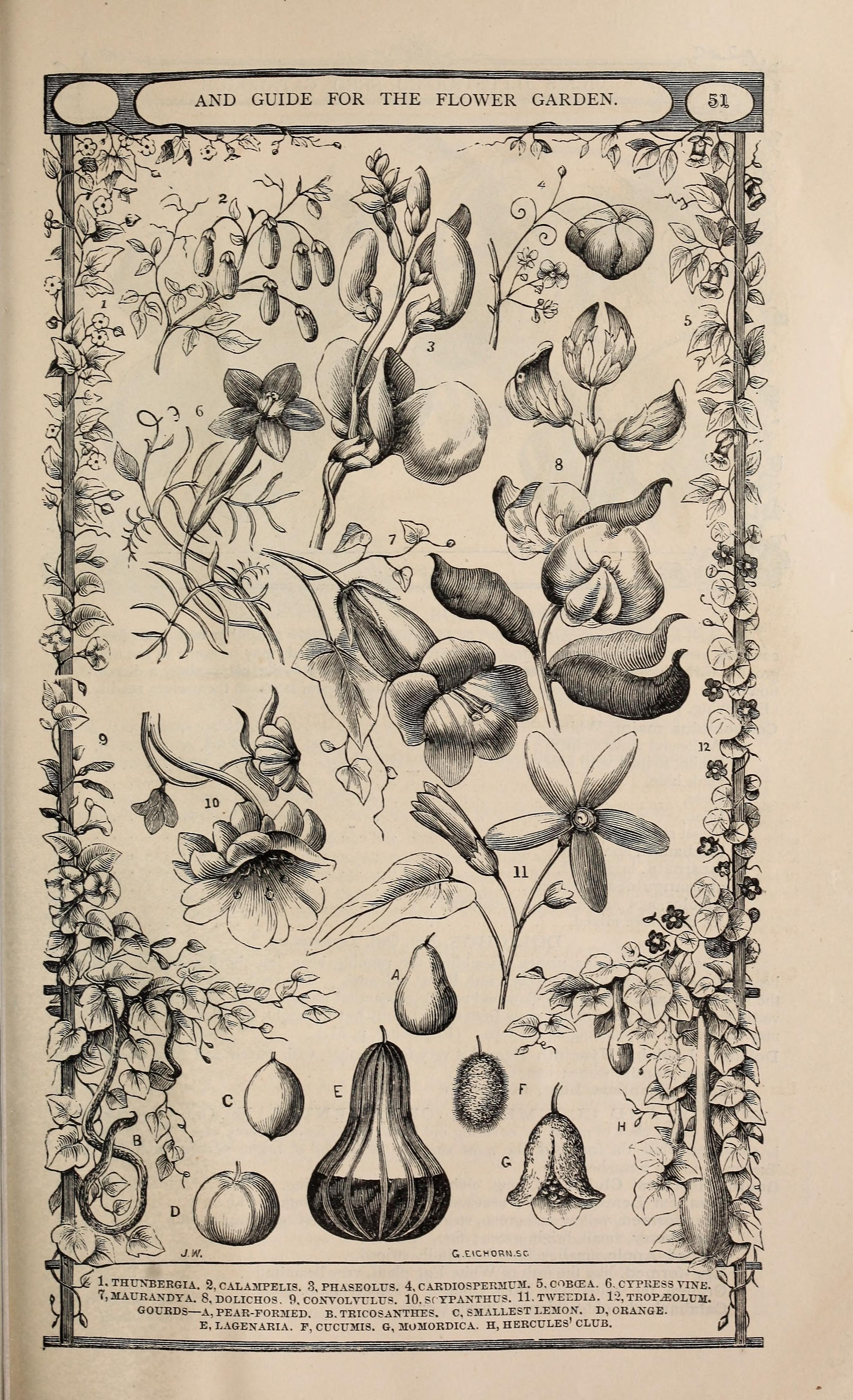

James Vick (November 23, 1818 - 1882) was a printer, seed seller, and gardening catalog publisher in Rochester, New York. His gardening magazine doubled as a seed catalogue and issues were beautifully illustrated and contained content and descriptions for gardening enthusiasts. From semi-annual to quarterly and eventually monthly, his Vick's Illustrated publication ran for decades.

He was born in England.

Hundreds of thousands of copies of his catalogues were sent out annually.

He had a home on East Avenue in Rochester, New York.

He built Union Park Racetrack through his garden properties. The area is now Vick Park A and B.

His son continued the then monthly magazine after he died.
